A Private Function is a 1984 British comedy film starring Michael Palin and Maggie Smith. The film was predominantly filmed in Ilkley, and Ben Rhydding in West Yorkshire. The film was also screened in the section of Un Certain Regard at the 1985 Cannes Film Festival.

Synopsis
In a small town in Northern England in 1947, the citizens endure continuing food rationing. Some local businessmen want to hold a party to celebrate the royal Wedding of Princess Elizabeth to Prince Philip and illegally decide to raise a pig for that occasion. However, the pig is stolen by Gilbert Chilvers, who was encouraged to do so by his wife Joyce. Meanwhile, the local food inspector is determined to stop activities circumventing the food rationing.

Cast

Production
Three pigs were used in the filming of A Private Function which were all named Betty. Producer Mark Shivas was advised by Intellectual Animals UK that the pigs used should be female and six months old so as to not be too large or aggressive. However, the pigs were “unpredictable and often quite dangerous”.

During filming of one of the kitchen scenes, Maggie Smith was hemmed in by one of the pigs and needed to vault over the back of it in order to escape.

Release
The film had a Royal charity premiere on 21 November 1984 before being screened at the London Film Festival on 22 November and opening at the Odeon Haymarket in London on 30 November.

Reception
On Sneak Previews in 1985, both Gene Siskel and Roger Ebert gave the movie two thumbs up. They called it one “really funny movie” and one “flat out winner.” Siskel said it “had perfectly believable characters” and Ebert said “just beneath this veneer of respectability is utter madness.”

Box office
The film made £1,560,000 in the UK.

Awards
The film won three BAFTA Film Awards: Best Actress for Maggie Smith, Best Supporting Actress for Liz Smith and Best Supporting Actor, for Denholm Elliott. It was also nominated for Best Original Screenplay (Alan Bennett) and Best Film.

Musical adaptation
A musical based on the film opened in the West End in April 2011 under the new title Betty Blue Eyes. It was produced by Cameron Mackintosh and ran for several months at the Novello Theatre. It starred Reece Shearsmith as Gilbert and Sarah Lancashire as Joyce.

References

External links
 
 
 
 

1984 films
1984 comedy films
British comedy films
Films directed by Malcolm Mowbray
Films scored by John Du Prez
Films with screenplays by Alan Bennett
Films set in 1947
Films set in England
HandMade Films films
British independent films
1984 directorial debut films
1980s English-language films
1980s British films